Madonna with angel (Slovak: Madona s anjelom) is a painting by Ľudovít Fulla from 1929.

Description
The picture was created in  1929. 
It has the dimensions 80.5 x 70.5 centimeters. It is in the collection of the Slovak National Gallery.

Analysis
Fulla incorporated Slovak folk art with avant-garde painting.  Mother and child, Madonna was a theme in his work.

References 

1929 paintings
Slovak culture